The Harrisburg Senators were an American basketball team based in Harrisburg, Pennsylvania, that was originally formed as a member of the American Basketball League, where it played for one season.

From 1947 to 1951, the Harrisburg Senators played in the Eastern Professional Basketball League.  Without a true basketball arena available at the time, the Senators split their games between the Madrid Palestra and the Zembo Mosque, two buildings that were large enough to hold a court and bleachers.  During that time, the team's leading scorer was Joe Cackovic.  The franchise reached the EPBL finals in both the 1948–49 and 1949–50 seasons.

Change from Harrisburg Senators to Harrisburg Caps
The Senators had trouble filling the huge Zembo Mosque during the 1950–51 season, and visiting teams complained that the basketball floor at the mosque was often waxed for dance halls, and that the Senators applied rosin on their shoes to countermand the slippery surface. The franchise folded midway through the 1950–51 season and was replaced by another franchise, the Harrisburg Caps, who finished out the Senators' season. After sitting out the 1951–52 season, the Caps returned to the EPBL and played their home games at the Madrid Palestra. The 1952–53 Caps' lineup was strengthened by the addition of four players from the Fort Indiantown Gap, Pennsylvania Army base, who played for both the military team and for the Caps. But with the season winding down and the Caps mistakenly believing they had been eliminated from the playoffs, the Fort Indiantown Gap players quit the team and the Caps were forced to use semipro hoopsters to finish out the final two contests.

Year-by-year

Harrisburg Senators, ABL

Harrisburg Senators, EPBL

Harrisburg Caps, EPBL

Senators
Defunct basketball teams in Pennsylvania
Continental Basketball Association teams
1947 establishments in Pennsylvania